Frederick Nelson Pyatt (born September 9, 1953) is a Canadian former professional ice hockey player. Pyatt was born in Port Arthur, Ontario. Drafted in 1973 by both the Detroit Red Wings of the National Hockey League and the Minnesota Fighting Saints of the World Hockey Association, Pyatt also played for the Washington Capitals and Colorado Rockies.

He is the father of Jesse and former NHL players Tom and Taylor Pyatt.

Regular season and playoffs

External links

1953 births
Living people
Canadian ice hockey centres
Colorado Rockies (NHL) players
Detroit Red Wings draft picks
Detroit Red Wings players
Fort Worth Texans players
Ice hockey people from Ontario
Sportspeople from Thunder Bay
London Lions (ice hockey) players
Minnesota Fighting Saints draft picks
Oshawa Generals players
Philadelphia Firebirds (AHL) players
Virginia Wings players
Washington Capitals players
Canadian expatriate sportspeople in the United States
Canadian expatriate ice hockey players in England